This alphabetical list is limited to comedians who share their comedy through music and song. Usually they play an instrument onstage.

List

References 

Musical
List